Lepidodactylus flaviocularis, also known as the yellow-eyed scaly-toed gecko or yellow-eyed gecko, is a species of gecko. It is endemic to Guadalcanal in the Solomon Islands.

References

Lepidodactylus
Reptiles described in 1992